Logic Programming Associates (LPA) is a company specializing in logic programming and artificial intelligence software. LPA was founded in 1980 and is widely known for its range of Prolog compilers and more recently for VisiRule.

LPA was established to exploit research at the Department of Computing and Control at Imperial College London into logic programming carried out under the supervision of Prof Robert Kowalski. One of the first implementations made available by LPA was micro-PROLOG which ran on popular 8-bit home computers such as the Sinclair Spectrum and Apple II. This was followed by micro-PROLOG Professional one of the first Prolog implementations for MS-DOS.

As well as continuing with Prolog compiler technology development, LPA has a track record of creating innovative associated tools and products to address specific challenges and opportunities.

History 
In 1989, LPA developed the Flex expert system toolkit, which incorporated frame-based reasoning with inheritance, rule-based programming and data-driven procedures. Flex has its own English-like Knowledge Specification Language (KSL) which means that knowledge and rules are defined in an easy-to-read and understand way.

In 1992, LPA helped set up the Prolog Vendors Group, a not-for-profit organization whose aim was to help promote Prolog by making people aware of its usage in industry.

In 2000, LPA helped set up Business Integrity Ltd, to bring to market document assembly technology. This lead the creation of Contract Express which became sold to most major law firms. In 2015, Thomson Reuters acquired Business Integrity Ltd.

LPA's core product is LPA Prolog for Windows , a compiler and development system for the Microsoft Windows platform. The current LPA software range comprises an integrated AI toolset which covers various aspects of Artificial Intelligence including Logic Programming, Expert Systems, Knowledge-based Systems, Data Mining, Agents and Case-based reasoning etc.

In 2004, LPA launched VisiRule  a graphical tool for developing knowledge-based and decision support systems. VisiRule has been used in various sectors, to build legal expert systems, machine diagnostic programs, medical and financial advice systems, etc.

Customers
For many years, LPA has worked closely with Valdis Krebs, an American-Latvian researcher, author, and consultant in the field of social and organizational network analysis. Valdis is the founder and chief scientist of Orgnet, and the creator of the popular Inflow  software package.

References

External links
LPA home page
About LPA
Micro-PROLOG (in Spanish)
Aspects of PROLOG History
VisiRule demos
VisiRule: a new graphical business rules tool from LPA
A flex-based expert system for sewage treatment works support
ESSE: An Expert System for Software Evaluation
LPA Delivers A Range Of Software Development Tools For Both Programmers And Non-Programmers

Software companies of the United Kingdom
Expert systems
Knowledge engineering
Knowledge representation
Department of Computing, Imperial College London